Bill B. Bruhy (July 16, 1916 – July 15, 1977) was an American politician and telephone company executive.

Born in West Bend, Wisconsin, Bruhy went to school in Plymouth, Wisconsin and to Ripon College, in Ripon, Wisconsin. Bruhy served in the United States Army during World War II. He worked as an outside plant manager for General Telephone. Bruhy served in the Wisconsin State Assembly in 1973 and was a Republican. Bruhy also served as mayor of Plymouth from 1966 until his death in 1977. Bruhy died of cancer in Plymouth, Wisconsin.

Notes

1916 births
1977 deaths
People from Plymouth, Wisconsin
People from West Bend, Wisconsin
Ripon College (Wisconsin) alumni
Military personnel from Wisconsin
Mayors of places in Wisconsin
Republican Party members of the Wisconsin State Assembly
Deaths from cancer in Wisconsin
20th-century American politicians
United States Army personnel of World War II